The Gandaki River, also known as the Narayani and the Gandak, is one of the major rivers in Nepal and a left bank tributary of the Ganges in India. In the Nepal Himalayas, it is notable for its deep canyon.

River course

Nepal

The headwaters stream on some maps is named the Chhuama Khola and then, nearing Lo Manthang, the Nhichung Khola or Choro Khola. The Kali Gandaki then flows southwest (with the name of Mustang Khola on old, outdated maps) through a sheer-sided, deep canyon before widening at the steel footbridge at Chele, where part of its flow funnels through a rock tunnel, and from this point the now wide river is called the Kali Gandaki on all maps. In Kagbeni a major tributary named Johng Khola, Kak Khola or Krishnaa descends from Muktinath.

The river then flows southward through a steep gorge known as the Kali Gandaki Gorge, or Andha Galchi, between the mountains Dhaulagiri, elevation  to the west and Annapurna I, elevation  to the east. If one measures the depth of a canyon by the difference between the river height and the heights of the highest peaks on either side, this gorge is the world's deepest. As tectonic activity forces the mountains higher, the river has cut through the uplift.
South of the gorge, the river is joined by Rahughat Khola at Galeshwor, Myagdi Khola at Beni, Modi Khola near Kushma and Badigaad at Rudrabeni above Ridi Bazaar. The river then turns east to run along the northern edge of the Mahabharat Range. One of the largest hydroelectricity project in Nepal is located along this stretch of the river. Turning south again and breaking through the Mahabharats, Kali Gandaki is then joined by a major tributary, the Trishuli, at Devghat, which is larger than the Kali Gandaki. Gandaki is then joined by the East Rapti River draining the Inner Terai valley known as Chitwan.  The Gandaki then crosses the outermost foothills of the Himalayas—Sivalik Hills—into the Terai plains of Nepal. From Devghat, the river flows southwest of Gaindakot town. The river later curves back towards the southeast as it enters India where it is called the Gandak.

Below Gaindakot the river is known as the Narayani or Sapt Gandaki (Seven Gandakis), for seven tributaries rising in the Himalaya or further north along the main Ganges-Brahmaputra divide.  These are the Kali Gandaki, the Trishuli River, and the five main tributaries of the Trishuli known as the Daraudi, Seti, Madi, Marsyandi and Budhi Gandaki.

India
The entry point of the river at the Indo–Nepal border is also the confluence called Triveni with rivers Pachnad and Sonha descending from Nepal. Pandai river flows into Bihar (India) from Nepal in the eastern end of the Valmiki Sanctuary and meets Masan. The Gandak enters India at first in Maharajganj District of Uttar Pradesh for around 25 KM, it also passes through Kushinagar District before entering Bihar. It joins the Ganges near Patna just downstream of Hajipur at Sonpur (also known as Harihar Kshetra).

From its exit from the outermost Siwaliks foothills to the Ganges, the Gandak has built an immense megafan comprising Eastern Uttar Pradesh and North Western Bihar in the Middle Gangetic Plains. The megafan consists of sediments eroded from the rapidly uplifting Himalaya. The river's course over this structure is constantly shifting.

Glaciers, glacial lakes and glacial lake outburst floods
The Gandaki river basin is reported to contain 1025 glaciers and 338 lakes. These contribute substantially to the lean season flows of the river.

Glacier lakes, among the most hazardous features of high mountains, are usually formed behind dams of moraine debris left behind by retreating glaciers, a trend that is observed all over the world. Even though glacial lake outburst flood (GLOF) events have been occurring in Nepal for many decades, the Dig Tsho glacier outburst, which took place in 1985, has triggered detailed study of this phenomenon. In 1996, the Water and Energy Commission Secretariat (WECS) of Nepal reported that five lakes were potentially dangerous, namely, Dig Tsho, Imja, Lower Barun, Tsho Rolpa, and Thulagi, all lying above . A recent study done by ICIMOD and UNEP (UNEP, 2001) reported 27 potentially dangerous lakes in Nepal. In ten of them GLOF events have occurred in the past few years and some have been regenerating after the event.

Thulagi glacier 
The Thulagi glacier, which is located in the Upper Marsyangdi River basin, is one out of the two moraine-dammed lakes (supra-glacial lakes), identified as a potentially dangerous lake. The KfW, Frankfurt, the BGR (Federal Institute for Geosciences and Natural Resources, Germany), in cooperation with the Department of Hydrology and Meteorology in Kathmandu, have carried out studies on the Thulagi Glacier and have concluded that even assuming the worst case, a disastrous outburst of the lake can be excluded in the near future.

Important towns 

The important towns in the Indian part of the Gandak river are Valmikinagar (Bhainsalotan) - location of Gandak Barrage, Bagaha, Bettiah (district headquarters & field directorate of Valmiki Tiger Project), Harinagar (Ramnagar), Hajipur (across the Ganges 10  km from Patna) and Sonepur (also Known as Harihar Kshetra), near Patna.

In traditional and popular culture

The Gandaki river is mentioned in the ancient Sanskrit epic Mahabharata.
Its evolution is described in Shiva Purana, Kumarakhand, in the chapter of the killing of Shankhachuda.
Episode 1 of "The Living Planet," David Attenborough's second nature documentary series, is set in the Kali Gandaki Gorge.

National Parks 
Chitwan National Park of Nepal and Valmiki National Park of India are adjacent to each other in the vicinity of Valmikinagar around the Gandak Barrage.

Chitwan National Park 

Established in 1973, it is the oldest national park of Nepal. It was granted the status of a World Heritage Site in 1984. It is located in Chitwan, one of the Inner Terai Valleys of Nepal. The park is rich in flora and fauna, including Bengal Tigers and one of the last populations of single-horned Indian rhinoceros (Rhinoceros unicornis). The area used to be known as the Chitwan Valley. It was a place for big game hunting and until 1951 it was a hunting reserve. At the park there is canoeing, elephant rides, and guided jungle walks.

Valmiki National Park 
It is ranked fourth in terms density of tiger population. Valmikinagar is a small town with scattered habitation, mostly within the forest area and has a railroad station in the district of West Champaran, close to the railhead of Narkatiaganj. It has diverse landscapes, sheltering rich wildlife habitats and floral and faunal composition with the prime protected carnivores and was included in the National Conservation Programme of the Project Tiger in the year 1994. As per Zoological Survey of India's report of 1998 the sanctuary is reported to shelter 53 mammals, 145 birds, 26 reptile and 13 amphibians. and Tiger Reserve

The notable species of wild fauna include: tiger, leopard, wild dog, wild boar, bison, bear, peacock, partridge, hornbill, hill mynah, woolly-necked stork, python, crocodile, deer, sambar, blue bull, barking deer, hog deer.

As per the Botanical Survey of India report of 1998 there are seven types of vegetation consisting of seven classes of forests; home to 84 species of trees (subtropical trees such as sal, sagwan, bamboo, and cane), 32 shrubs and climbers and 81 herbs and grasses.

Religious significance

Valmiki Ashram 

The ancient Valmiki  Ashram (hermitage) and surrounding temples are located in the Chitwan National Park of Nepal. It is located at a distance of about 7 km from Valmikinagar. It is approachable for pilgrimage only from Valmikinagar near Gandak Barrage, both from Nepal and India.

It is said that Valmiki Rishi (sage) wrote the great epic, "Ramayana" here. It is also believed to be the birthplace of Lava & Kusha (the two sons of Lord Ram and his divine wife Sita. The hermitage also has landmarks of Sita’s ‘Falahar’ (eating place),  Meditation place of the great Sage Valmiki, the place where the Ashwamedh horse was tied, Amrit (nectar of immortality) Kuan (well); Vishnu Chakra (disc), and the Hawan (Yagna) Kund (sacred square structure to perform fire rituals).

In the periphery of  around the Valmiki Ashram, the temples of importance are a) the Jatashankar (Shiv) Temple, 2) Nardevi (Sweta Kali) Temple (Form of Durga and 3) Kaleshwaran (an avatar of the God Shiva) Temple. Triveni Temple is located across the Gandak Barrage in Nepal, about 3 km from the Gandak Barrage.

Shaligrams and Mukthinath 
Ammonite fossils collected from the bed of the Gandaki River at a place close to Saligrama or Muktinath (literally "place of salvation") in the Mustang district of Nepal are known as shaligrams or shilas and are considered aniconic representations of Vishnu. These are first mentioned in "Devi Bhagavath". In the puranas there is a description of a king, named Dharmadwaja, who was initially a devotee of goddess Lakshmi and who later became her rival which completely ruined him. His son Padmadwaja realized his father's mistake and became a devotee of Lakshmi. Pleased with his devotion, Lakshmi herself incarnated as Tulasi.

Later Tulasi fell in love with Lord Krishna. They married to immortalize their bond. Lord Krishna converted himself as Salagrava (saligram) and Tulasi as the river Gandaki. Even today Salagrava can only be found in the Gandaki river.

The Great Master Sri Shankaracharya who knew this story told it to his disciples; that whenever these stones are taken for the purpose of worship one should never worship those shila without Tulasi, to maintain the relation of Tulasi and Sri Krishna. He further said that the Tulasi which we use for worship, is the hair of Tulasi who converted into river Gandaki. Shankaracharya is quoted in his Brahmasutras about the Salagrava: yatha salagrame Harihe, "salagrama eva visno etyethdupayukameva", "yatha slagrame visnuhu sanihita eti tatvat". Even today all his amnaya peetas have a salagrava for their compulsory daily rituals. Silas are considered unique and are used for worship.

It is a sacred place for Buddhists who call it Chumig Gyatsa, which in Tibetan means 'Hundred Waters'. Hindus call this place Muktinath as well as Mukthiksehtra, which literally means "place of salvation".

These stones are naturally formed round stones, with circular or spiral markings and are fossil ammonite stones found in the rivers of the Himalayas, in particular kinds of ocean sediments, which have been uplifted to the top of the Himalayas.

Between the Dhaulagiri and Annapurna mountain ranges, the Gandaki River flows through the village of Saligrama or Muktinath and the Ashrama of Pulaha. In ancient times, the mountain range surrounding Pulaha was called Salagiris due to the vast forests of sala (sal) trees. The stones found in this region are therefore called Saligrama – Silas (stones found only in the region of Saligrama). It has great significance to Hindus, particularly to Brahmins. Smarthas uses this as the replica of lord Narayana. Srivaisnavas, and Madhva sects who consider the place where one can find saligrama silas in the river bed of the Gandaki River, and the Mukthinath temple as one of the 108 Divyakshetrams or Thirthastanas (temples of Vishnu) to be visited on a pilgrimage (at least once in their life). At the pilgrimage site of Muktinath (3,710m) one wonders in amazement at the presence of 108 small waterfalls and mysterious natural gas fires, worshiped as Jwalamukhi (in Sanskrit).

For Tibetan Buddhists, Muktinath-Chumig Gyatsa is a place of Dakinis, goddesses known as Sky Dancers. It is of great importance for Buddhists that Chumig Gyatsa is one of the 24 Tantric places.

The Tibetan Buddhist tradition states that for this reason Guru Rinpoche, also known as Padmasambhava, the founder of Tibetan Buddhism meditated at Muktinath on his way to Tibet. It is one of the 51 Shakti peetams.

The particular site in the course of the river where the stones become sacred is known as Chakra-Tirtha. The sanctity of this site is said to extend to three yojanas (24 miles) all round.

There is a tributary called Chakra-nadi or Jhong Khola that flows from Muktinath and joins the Kali Gandaki at Kagbeni. The entire area (including streams and the mountainside to the north of Muktinath) covers as many as 12 yojanas (96 miles), according to the Puranic account. Among the Saligrama stones, some are from the waters (jalaja) and some are from the mountainside (sthalaja). Puranic texts testify that the sacred stones are what are found in the river and not what are taken out of the rock on its banks.

Nepali Mandir, Hajipur 
It is a unique Shaivite shrine near Hajipur made in the late medieval period (18th century), by one of the army commanders of Nepal. The temple brings-in a fresh pagoda-style architecture of the Himalayan Kingdom to the plains of the Ganges. This temple is built largely of wood. Another distinctive feature of this temple is its fine wooden carving, which includes, of others, generous erotic scenes.

Places of archaeological significance 
Archaeologically important places around Valmikinagar are Lauriya-Nandangarh and Someshwar Fort.

Its massiveness and exquisite finish furnish striking proof of the skill and resources of the masons of Ashokan age. Two more such pillars with their capitals removed have been discovered in Rampurwa village, close to Gandhi's Bhitiharawa Ashram in Gaunaha block. One of their capitals, the bull is now in the National Museum at New Delhi and the other, the lion, is at Calcutta Museum.

Someshwar Fort is situated in Narkatiaganj sub-division, near Nepal border, on top of Someshwar Hill at  altitude. It is in a ruined state but its remains are well defined.

The Bhitiharawa Ashram of Mahatma Gandhi near Gaunaha in the eastern end of the Valmiki reserve. It is a village in Gaunaha block in Bihar from where Gandhiji started his freedom movement that came to be known as 'Champaran Satyagraha' in India history. The village houses the hut which is called Ashram and has become a place of Gandhian pilgrimage.

Mustang Caves 

Mustang caves are a collection of some 10,000 man-made caves dug into the sides of valleys in the Mustang District of Nepal. The caves lie on the steep valley walls near the Kali Gandaki River in Upper Mustang. Several groups of archaeologists and researchers have explored these stacked caves and found partially mummified human bodies and skeletons that are at least 2,000-3,000 years old. Explorations of these caves by conservators and archaeologists have also led to the discovery of valuable religious paintings, sculptures, manuscripts and numerous artifacts belonging to the 12th to 14th century.

Development scenario

Hydropower development

Nepal 
In Nepal, Sapta Gandaki alone has a huge hydropower potential of 20,650 MW (economic exploitable potential is 5,270 MW) out of a total estimated potential of 83,290 MW (economically exploitable potential is 42,140 MW). The country has so far been able to generate only around 600 MW of hydropower out of which the Gandak basin projects contribute more than 266 MW, about 44%. The hydropower projects built are the Trisuli at Nuwakot (21 MW), Devighat at Nuwakot (14 MW), Pokhra (1 MW) and Western Gandak HEP, at Nawalparasi (15 MW), Marsyangdi at Tanahu (69 MW), Kali Gandaki at Syanja (144 MW), and Syange (2 MW). Middle Marsyangdi HE Project (70 MW) at Lamjung is under final stage of construction.  Several major projects are on the anvil for implementation in the near future. With Government of Nepal now according priority to private-sector participation in a multi-pronged approach, the pace of hydropower development will get accelerated.

A major Indian firm has entered into a share purchase and joint venture agreement with a Nepalese firm to acquire 80 per cent stake of Nepalese Company for development of the Upper Marsyangdi HEP (250MW). Achieving the economically exploitable potential need would no more be a mirage.

Reportedly there are several other major projects being pursued by the Government of Nepal for private sector participation on IPP basis.

Irrigation 
An agreement was signed on 4 December 1959 between the governments of Nepal and of India on the Gandak Irrigation and Power Project. The agreement was modified in 1964 for the protection of Nepal's riparian rights. Basically there is an agreed share of water for ‘western canal system including a power station in Nepal and eastern canal system. As a part of this bilateral agreement, the Gandak Barrage, a part of Gandak Project, was built in 1968–69 over the Gandak river for providing irrigation to Nepal, Uttar Pradesh and Bihar. The Eastern Gandak Canal Project was taken up in 1960 and Main Canal system was completed in 1975 for flow irrigation in Nepal for the gross commanded area estimated to be .

A Gandak Hydropower Station with an installed capacity of 15 MW has also been constructed and commissioned on the bypass to Eastern Gandak Canal.

Flood management 
Flood management does not aim at total elimination or control of floods or providing total immunity from the effects of all magnitudes of floods, which is neither practicable from economic considerations nor even necessary, keeping in view other realities that are faced in the Indian context. Thus, a multi-pronged strategy ranging from modifying the floods by means of structural measures to learning to live with the floods by means of other non-structural measures is the goal of flood management. Measures for protection against extreme floods of low frequency are seldom economically feasible. The term "flood management" refers to the provision of a reasonable degree of protection against floods by measures to mitigate the recurring havoc caused by floods. This is what is being done in flood plains of Gandak River in Bihar and Uttar Pradesh which are affected by floods.

Navigation on the river 
Nepal has carried out studies on the feasibility of having navigational use of the Gandaki river. Studies indicate that (a) it is feasible only in the lower reaches, (b) link it with India's number 1 highway from Allahabad to Haldia, and (c) cognizance has to be taken of the adverse situation which could arise due to increased irrigation use in dry seasons which could restrict the river level for maintaining possible navigation.

See also
Kali Gandaki Gorge

References

 India's Water Wealth (1975, Dr. K.L.Rao, Orient Longman Ltd, Hyderabad, New Delhi
 "Waters of Hope" (1993), B.G.Vargehese, New Delhi
 A Framework for Sustainable Development of the Ganges- Brahmaputra- Meghna (GBM Region), Proceedings of Conference held in Dhaka, 4–5 December 1999–Nepal Water Vision in the GBM Regional Framework, Institute for Integrated Studies, Kathmandu).

External links

 Thulagi Glacier and Lake
 WILD LIFE SANCTUARIES AND NATIONAL PARKS
 Valmiki Tiger Reserve
 GMR energy to acquire 80% stake in Nepal's Himtal Power
 Gandak Barrage
 The India-Nepal Treaty
 Ministry of Water Resources

International rivers of Asia
Rivers of Gandaki Province
Rivers of Bihar
Rivers of Patna
Ancient Indian rivers
Tributaries of the Ganges
Rivers in Buddhism
Rivers of India
Braided rivers in India

ne:गण्डकी नदी